Elise Mertens and An-Sophie Mestach were the defending champions, but both players chose not to participate.

Nicola Geuer and Anna Zaja won the title when Ana Bogdan and Ioana Loredana Roșca retired in the final at 6–3, 2–2.

Seeds

Draw

References 
 Draw

Engie Open Andrézieux-Bouthéon 42 - Doubles